The 2003 Valencian regional election was held on Sunday, 25 May 2003, to elect the 6th Corts of the Valencian Community. All 89 seats in the Corts were up for election. The election was held simultaneously with regional elections in twelve other autonomous communities and local elections all throughout Spain.

Despite growing discontent with the nationwide José María Aznar's government, the People's Party (PP) was able to comfortably retain its absolute majority in the Corts, losing only one seat compared to 1999, which was gained by the Agreement (Entesa) alliance led by United Left of the Valencian Country (EUPV). The Socialist Party of the Valencian Country (PSPV–PSOE), while increasing its vote share in two percentage points compared to its 1999 result, failed to translate it into any new seats. Valencian Union (UV), the former PP coalition partner during the first Zaplana government (1995–1999), continued its decline into irrelevance and fell below 3%, depriving it of any possibility of overcoming the five percent threshold to enter the Corts.

Francisco Camps became the new president of the Valencian Government succeeding José Luis Olivas, who had replaced Eduardo Zaplana in 2002 after the latter was named Labour and Social Affairs minister in Aznar's second cabinet.

Overview

Electoral system
The Corts Valencianes were the devolved, unicameral legislature of the Valencian autonomous community, having legislative power in regional matters as defined by the Spanish Constitution and the Valencian Statute of Autonomy, as well as the ability to vote confidence in or withdraw it from a regional president.

Voting for the Corts was on the basis of universal suffrage, which comprised all nationals over 18 years of age, registered in the Valencian Community and in full enjoyment of their political rights. The 89 members of the Corts Valencianes were elected using the D'Hondt method and a closed list proportional representation, with a threshold of five percent of valid votes—which included blank ballots—being applied regionally. Parties not reaching the threshold were not taken into consideration for seat distribution. Seats were allocated to constituencies, corresponding to the provinces of Alicante, Castellón and Valencia, with each being allocated an initial minimum of 20 seats and the remaining 29 being distributed in proportion to their populations (provided that the seat-to-population ratio in any given province did not exceed three times that of any other).

Election date
The term of the Corts Valencianes expired four years after the date of their previous election, with elections to the Corts being fixed for the fourth Sunday of May every four years. The previous election was held on 13 June 1999, setting the election date for the Corts on Sunday, 25 May 2003.

The Corts Valencianes could not be dissolved before the date of expiry of parliament.

Parties and candidates
The electoral law allowed for parties and federations registered in the interior ministry, coalitions and groupings of electors to present lists of candidates. Parties and federations intending to form a coalition ahead of an election were required to inform the relevant Electoral Commission within ten days of the election call, whereas groupings of electors needed to secure the signature of at least one percent of the electorate in the constituencies for which they sought election, disallowing electors from signing for more than one list of candidates.

Below is a list of the main parties and electoral alliances which contested the election:

Opinion polls
The table below lists voting intention estimates in reverse chronological order, showing the most recent first and using the dates when the survey fieldwork was done, as opposed to the date of publication. Where the fieldwork dates are unknown, the date of publication is given instead. The highest percentage figure in each polling survey is displayed with its background shaded in the leading party's colour. If a tie ensues, this is applied to the figures with the highest percentages. The "Lead" column on the right shows the percentage-point difference between the parties with the highest percentages in a poll. When available, seat projections determined by the polling organisations are displayed below (or in place of) the percentages in a smaller font; 45 seats were required for an absolute majority in the Corts Valencianes.

Results

Overall

Distribution by constituency

Aftermath

Government formation

2006 motion of no confidence

References
Opinion poll sources

Other

2003 in the Valencian Community
Valencian Community
Regional elections in the Valencian Community
May 2003 events in Europe